Jacob Cohen (born 25 September 1956) is an Israeli former professional footballer that has played in several clubs throughout Europe, including Hapoel Be'er Sheva, Brighton & Hove Albion, Maccabi Tel Aviv, and Hapoel Tel Aviv.

Playing career 
Cohen was bought by Brighton & Hove Albion from Hapoel Be'er Sheva for £40,000 in October 1980, but had made only six appearances.

Honours

Club
 Hapoel Be'er Sheva

 Premier League:
 Winners (2): 1974/1975, 1975/1976
 Super Cup:
 Winners (1): 1974/1975
 Runners-up (1): 1975/1976

 Hapoel Tel Aviv

 Premier League:
 Winners (1): 1985/1986

References

Footnotes

1956 births
Living people
Israeli footballers
Israel international footballers
Hapoel Be'er Sheva F.C. players
Brighton & Hove Albion F.C. players
Beitar Tel Aviv F.C. players
Maccabi Tel Aviv F.C. players
Hapoel Tel Aviv F.C. players
Maccabi Petah Tikva F.C. players
Israeli expatriate footballers
Expatriate footballers in England
Israeli expatriate sportspeople in England
Liga Leumit players
Footballers from Beersheba
Association football fullbacks